"A Heart Is a House for Love" (title often confused with "A Heart Is A House Of Love") is a 1991 hit soul and R&B song composed by Tristin Sigerson, Davitt Sigerson, and Bob Thiele and recorded by The Dells. It was originally featured in the movie and soundtrack album The Five Heartbeats (which is loosely based on the real lives of male soul groups such as The Dells). The song originally only climbed to number 94 on the R&B/Hip Hop section of the Billboard American charts, but peaked at number thirteen after the release of the movie. It was The Dells' most successful hit of the 1990s. It was also their last hit single to reach the top 20 of any Billboard Chart.

History

The song was originally featured in the 1991 feature film The Five Heartbeats, which follows the lives of the fictional singing group of the same name. In the scene the song is featured in, the group is about to perform in a Battle of the Bands when the announcer, a cousin of another musician in the competition, tells them backstage that a new house rule demands they use a piano player hired by the owners of the building. The members of the group have not practiced with the piano player, and quickly realize this will harm their performance. The announcer then goads the audience into booing and throwing objects at the Heartbeats as they perform. Duck, tired of his music being altered, throws the piano player off the stage and plays in his own style. The crowd soon applauds as The Heartbeats perform together and the group wins the contest.

The movie version and the single version are different. In the film only the first verse and some of the chorus are sung before Duck interrupts the house piano player; the characters then continue to perform a cappella followed by improvised vocals accompanied by a beat created by the audience. The single features no a cappella vocals and follows a more traditional and contemporary style. There are three verses in the single leading to the outro (which includes the chorus sung with instrumentals). The instruments of the single version include heavy percussion and a light guitar melody.

Music video

The music video features the members of The Dells, who recorded both the single featured in the music video and the version featured in the movie. In the music video the group is seen in a music video recording their song, interrupted by flashbacks including clips from the movie and album covers from both the Dells and the fictional group The Five Heartbeats. One of the flashbacks shows the lead singer singing and cleaning with a woman and then spontaneously stripping off his clothes as she does the same. Although black and white clips are shown of the fictional Five Heartbeats, none of the choreography is featured. Instead the audience witnesses an aged appearance of the Dells who stand still while singing the song and attempt to imitate the clapping and snapping portrayed in the movie.

Credits 
 Composed by Tristin and Davitt Sigerson, and Bob Thiele
 Lead Vocals by Marvin Junior
 Background Vocals by Chuck Barksdale, Verne Allison, Michael McGill, and Johnny Carter
 Produced by George Duke

Charts

References

External links

See also
 The Dells
 The Five Heartbeats

1991 singles
Soul songs
Contemporary R&B ballads
Songs written for films
1991 songs